York County Council may be:

York County Council (Maine)
York County Council (Pennsylvania)